The 2012 TicketCity Bowl, the second edition of the game, was a post-season American college football bowl game, held on January 2, 2012, at the Cotton Bowl in Dallas, Texas, as one of the 2011–12 NCAA football bowl games.

The game, which was telecast at 11:00 a.m. CT on ESPNU, featured the Houston Cougars from Conference USA versus the Penn State Nittany Lions from the Big Ten Conference. The Houston Cougars won, .

The 2012 TicketCity Bowl marked the head coaching debut of Tony Levine, and the last college game of quarterback Case Keenum.

References

External links
 Game summary at ESPN

TicketCity Bowl
First Responder Bowl
Houston Cougars football bowl games
Penn State Nittany Lions football bowl games
January 2012 sports events in the United States
2012 in sports in Texas
2010s in Dallas